is a railway station on the Joetsu Line in the town of Yuzawa, Minamiuonuma District, Niigata Prefecture, Japan, operated by East Japan Railway Company (JR East).

Lines

Station layout
The station has two ground-level opposed side platforms connected by an underground passage. The station is unattended.

Platforms

History
The station first opened on 8 December 1933 as a temporary stop on the Joetsu Line. It was closed in 1946 when the nearby ski slope was taken over by the allied occupation forces. It reopened as a temporary stop on 20 December 1952, and from 1 September 1981, the station operated all year round. With the privatization of Japanese National Railways (JNR) on 1 April 1987, the station came under the control of JR East.

See also
 List of railway stations in Japan

References

External links

  

Railway stations in Niigata Prefecture
Railway stations in Japan opened in 1952
Jōetsu Line
Yuzawa, Niigata